Stigmella costalimai is a moth of the family Nepticulidae. It is known from Argentina.

External links
Nepticulidae and Opostegidae of the world

Nepticulidae
Moths of South America
Moths described in 1962